William Clancy was an Irish missionary.

William Clancy  may also refer to:
Liam Clancy, William Clancy, singer
Bill Clancy, baseball player

See also

Willie Clancy (disambiguation)